Ardian (formerly Axa Private Equity) is a France-based, independent private equity investment company, founded and managed by Dominique Senequier. It is one of the largest European-headquartered private equity funds. The company was originally set up by Dominique Senequier in 1996 as the AXA Group's private equity division, but later gained independence in 2013, and rebranded itself as Ardian. 
The name Ardian (ar・di・an) was inspired by an ancient European language in which 'hardjan' mean strength, durability, and boldness. Ardian manages assets worth US$150 billion in Europe, North America and Asia, and has fifteen offices  (Paris, London, Frankfurt, Milan, Madrid, Zurich, New York, San Francisco, Beijing, Singapore, Tokyo, Jersey, Luxembourg, Santiago, and Seoul). The firm offers a funds of funds, direct funds, infrastructure, private debt and real estate, and manages a direct portfolio of more than 150 companies, including , Luton Airport and SPIE. Its fund of funds segments owns stakes in over 1500 funds. Ardian's 880 investors include institutional investors, funds of funds, government agencies, sovereign funds, family offices, pension funds and insurance companies). The firm has been ranked one of the largest companies by amount raised in equity by Private Equity International, and was named "Company of the Year" 2013 by the readers of Private Equity International.

History

Originally part of Axa Investment Managers, the investment arm of Axa, the company operated under the name AXA Private Equity until 2013, when the firm achieved independent status and was renamed to Ardian.

In 1996, Claude Bébéar, founder and former Axa CEO, tasked Dominique Senequier with the creation of a private equity entity at Axa. Based in Paris, Axa Private Equity started off with ten clients and €100 million worth of assets. The first investment took place in 1998 in the GSI Banque company Linedata.

In 1999, the company opened offices in London and New York. That same year, it launched its funds of funds investment strategy.

In 2001, it entered the German market by opening an office in Frankfurt.

In 2005, it opened an office in Singapore and entered the Asian market. The same year, it launched its Infrastructure investment strategy.

As a result of the 2007 financial crisis, the company postponed all new operations and instead focused on the management of its portfolio, in an effort to shield its companies from the effects of the crisis.

In 2008, Dominique Senequier insisted on distributing a higher percentage of the company's capital gains to the employees of the companies in Ardian's portfolio.

In 2009, Ardian acquired 100% of Kallista, a French company specialized in the production of renewable energies. Ardian then invested heavily in transports, energy, water supply and waste management. €2.5 billion were invested in infrastructure systems between 2005 and 2014.

The same year it adopted the Principles for Responsible Investment (PRI) implemented by the UNPRI and published its CSR Charter.

In 2010, during the increased activity in the private equity secondary market, it acquired a US$1.9 billion private equity portfolio from Bank of America and a US$900 million portfolio from Natixis.

In 2012, the company opened an office in Beijing   to invest in the Chinese market.

In 2013, Axa Private Equity announced that it had completed its spin-off from the Axa Group and renamed the firm Ardian. Per the terms of the deal, Axa Group retained ownership of 23% of the firm, management and employees owned 46%, and the remaining 31% was held by French family offices and institutions.  Currently, 85% of employees are shareholders.

In 2013, Private Equity International ranked Ardian in the largest private equity firms by PE capital raised and named it Company of the Year 2013 in France.

In 2015, the firm opened an office in Madrid, Spain. On 7 September 2015, it announced the launch of Ardian Real Estate, dedicated to investment in non-residential properties in Europe. On 7 October 2015, it opened an office in San Francisco, USA,

In 2016, Ardian celebrated the company's 20th anniversary with a major expansion plan, targeting North America for their next phase of growth. In the following three years, they launched North American Buyout and Infrastructure funds, expanded in Asia with offices in Tokyo and Seoul, and opened their first South American office in Santiago.

In 2017,  Ardian opened an office in Tokyo, Japan.

In 2020, Ardian bought PRGX

In 2021 (finalized in 2022), Ardian bought Míla, Iceland’s largest telecom infrastructure company. 

In 2022, Ardian's 850 staff are responsible for $130bn of assets, confirming its place among an elite global group of private investment houses.

Activities
The company operates on five business segments:

• Funds of funds, which manages approximately $69 billion of assets focusing on primary, early secondary and secondary Funds of Funds.

• Direct funds, which manages approximately $28 billion.

• Infrastructure, which manages approximately $21 billion.

• Private debt, which manages approximately $10 billion.

• Real estate, launched September 2015, manages approximately $2 billion.

Governance and management
Ardian was founded and is managed by Dominique Senequier, who was one of the first seven women admitted to the French Ecole Polytechnique in France in 1972.

Key figures
• $130 billion of assets (managed or advised)

• 150+ companies in the direct funds portfolio

• 1 330+ investors

• 850 employees (2022)

• 15 offices (Northern America, Europe and Asia)

• $15 billion raised in 2021

• 85% of the employees are shareholders and hold, together, 52% of the company's capital

References

See also 
 Private equity
 Frulact

External links
Private equity firm Ardian seals $4.3 billion in secondary deals Reuters
Ardian's first 10 days Financial News
Axa Private Equity completes spin-out, now renamed Ardian peHub
Axa spin-out Ardian raises €2.8 billion Financial News

Financial services companies established in 1996
Financial services companies of France